Christian Köll (born 15 October 1975) is an Austrian football manager and former footballer who played as a forward.

External links
 

1975 births
Living people
Austrian footballers
FC Tirol Innsbruck players
WSG Tirol players
FC Lustenau players
Place of birth missing (living people)
Association football forwards